Josefina Cota Cota (born 3 June 1956) is a Mexican politician affiliated with the PRD. She served as Senator of the LX and LXI Legislatures of the Mexican Congress representing Baja California Sur. She previously served in the Congress of Baja California Sur from 1987 to 1991.

References

1956 births
Living people
People from La Paz, Baja California Sur
Women members of the Senate of the Republic (Mexico)
Members of the Senate of the Republic (Mexico)
Party of the Democratic Revolution politicians
Senators of the LX and LXI Legislatures of Mexico
21st-century Mexican politicians
21st-century Mexican women politicians
Politicians from Baja California Sur
20th-century Mexican politicians
20th-century Mexican women politicians
Members of the Congress of Baja California Sur